The Football Queensland Premier League 2, or the FQPL 2, is a football competition contested by clubs in South East Queensland, Australia. It is administered by Football Queensland and is the third tier of Football in Queensland, behind the Football Queensland Premier League, from which the top team from each season are promoted. The FQPL 2 was founded in 2020, with the first season held in 2021. The league has 4 teams from Brisbane, 2 from Gold Coast and 2 from Moreton Bay.

The current premiers and champions of the 2021 season are Caboolture Sports and Grange Thistle respectively.

History 
Following the foundation of the Football Queensland Premier League in 2017, Football Queensland sought to extend and link the footballing pyramid in Queensland to a third tier. At the time, there was only regional leagues across Queensland representing a 'third tier' in Queensland and a 'fourth tier' across Australia. In late 2020, the idea of a third league of Queensland football was proposed and 29 teams expressed interest in joining. In November 2020, 15 teams from South-East Queensland submitted formal FQPL 2 applications and on the 25th of November 2020, Football Queensland announced that eight teams would participate in the inaugural FQPL 2 season beginning 2021. The 8 inaugural members of the new Football Queensland Premier league 2 were:

 Caboolture Sports 
 Coomera Colts
 Grange Thistle
 Magic United
 North Star
 Samford Rangers
 Taringa Rovers
 Virginia United
The inaugural season of the FQPL 2 saw Caboolture Sports clinching the premiership, earning promotion to the 2022 Football Queensland Premier League. However, Grange Thistle won the championship from them in a 3–1 win over the premiers. In August 2021, Football Queensland announced that all its competitions would be temporarily suspended due to the COVID-19 Pandemic. As a result, the inaugural season experienced delays which would not affect the validity competition.

In 2021, Football Queensland announced that Albany Creek Excelsior from Football Queensland Metro and Surfers Paradise Apollo from Football Queensland South Coast would join the Football Queensland Premier League 2 for the 2022 season. These teams would join the competition along with Wynnum Wolves, Holland Park Hawks and Souths United, who were the first teams relegated from the Football Queensland Premier League. Additionally, the 2022 season would see an introduction of a form of relegation where the worst performing team would be relegated out of the competition and back into their respective top-flight regional competition in South East Queensland. The regional zones apart of this streamline conference include South Coast, Darling Downs, Metro and Sunshine Coast, with the other zones located too far geographically to be sustainable. The 2022 season would have 12 clubs compete, the teams placed in 11th and 12th would be relegated to their respective FQPL 3 competition, and the teams placed 1st and 2nd would be promoted to the FQPL. The team that would place third would enter a playoff competition with the 10th placed team in the FQPL for a place in the competition for the following season.

Clubs

2023 season 
Twelve clubs compete in the 2023 Football Queensland Premier League 2 season.

Honours 
Teams and seasons in bold indicate doubles with both the respective premiership and championship in a single season.

By season

By team

Awards

Player of the Year

Young Player of the Year

Goalkeeper of the Year

Coach of the Year

Fair Play Award

See also 
 Football Queensland
National Premier Leagues Queensland
Football Queensland Premier League

References 

Football Queensland
Soccer leagues in Queensland
Sports leagues established in 2020
2020 establishments in Australia
Fourth level football leagues in Asia